Justine Juliette Alice Roberts  (born October 1967) is the founder and chief executive of British websites Mumsnet and Gransnet.

Early life
Roberts was educated at Guildford High School and at New College, Oxford, where she read PPE.

Career
Roberts was named in the Media Guardian's 2010 power 100. Along with Mumsnet co-founder Carrie Longton, she was voted number 7 in BBC Woman's Hour'''s "Power List 2013" of the most powerful women in the UK.

In May 2011, Roberts founded Gransnet, a sister site to Mumsnet, for the over-50s.

She has appeared on The Media Show expressing concerns about legislation to regulate blogging, and in May 2013 she appeared on BBC Radio 4's Great Lives'' programme, nominating football manager Bill Shankly. On 24 December 2015, Roberts was listed by UK-based company Richtopia in the list of 500 Most Influential CEOs in the World.

Roberts was appointed Commander of the Order of the British Empire (CBE) in the 2017 New Year Honours for services to the economy.

Personal life
Roberts married journalist Ian Katz not long before founding Mumsnet. They had four children. The couple separated in 2019 and  Roberts is in a new relationship.

Recognition
She was recognized as one of the BBC's 100 women of 2013.

References

1967 births
Living people
Alumni of New College, Oxford
British technology company founders
People educated at Guildford High School
BBC 100 Women
Commanders of the Order of the British Empire